Jeevan Bahadur Shahi is a Nepalese politician currently serving as the Chief Minister of Karnali Province. He is also a member of Provincial Assembly of Karnali Province.

Political career 
He is a member of the Nepali Congress. Jeevan Bahadur Shahi has previously served as Minister for Culture, Tourism and Civil Aviation from 2016 to 2017.

Personal  life 
Shahi was born on 3 March 1965 in Humla District, Karnali Province, Nepal.

References 

 

21st-century Nepalese politicians
Living people
Members of the Provincial Assembly of Karnali Province
Nepalese politicians
Nepali Congress politicians from Karnali Province
People from Humla District
1965 births

Chief Ministers of Nepalese provinces
Members of the 2nd Nepalese Constituent Assembly